The M7 motorway is a Hungarian motorway which runs from Budapest towards the Croatian border at Letenye, reaching Székesfehérvár, then Siófok, a town on Lake Balaton, and the city of Nagykanizsa in the southwest of the country.

The motorway connects with the Croatian motorway A4 at Goričan and forms part of the Pan-European corridor Vb, connecting Budapest with Zagreb, the capital of Croatia, and Rijeka, the largest Croatian seaport. Since the completion of the M7 it is possible to travel on motorway from Budapest to the Adriatic Sea, a popular tourist destination for Hungarians.

The last portion of the motorway to the Croatian border, including the Zrinski Bridge on the river Mura, was completed on 22 October 2008. The road's first sections were built in the 1960s and 1970s. The completion of the last sections was undertaken since 2001.

Openings timeline
Budapest – Budaörs (7 km): 1964 - half profile; (this section was extended 2x3 lane in 1978-79)
Budaörs – Martonvásár (18 km): 1966 - half profile; (this section was extended in 1972; 2x3 lane in 2001)
Martonvásár – Velence (15 km): 1967 - half profile; (this section was extended in 1973; 2x3 lane in 2001)
Martonvásár – Székesfehérvár (12 km): 1968 - half profile; (this section was extended in 1973; 2x3 lane in 2001)
Székesfehérvár – Balatonaliga (33 km): 1970 - half profile; (this section was extended in 1975)
Balatonaliga – Zamárdi (22 km): 1971 - half profile; (this section was extended in 2001)
Zamárdi – Balatonszárszó with Kőröshegy Viaduct (14,2 km): 2007.08.08.
Balatonszárszó – Ordacsehi (20 km): 2005.06.
Ordacsehi – Balatonkeresztúr (25,7 km): 2006.03.27.
Balatonkeresztúr – Zalakomár (21 km): 2008.06.26.
Zalakomár – Nagykanizsa (15 km): 2008.08.19.
Nagykanizsa – Sormás (11,3 km): 2007.08.24.
Sormás (Eszteregnye) – Becsehely (4,5 km): 2006.12.11.
Becsehely – Letenye (6,5 km): 2004.09.18.
Letenye ( border) with Zrínyi Bridge (800 m): 2008.10.22.

Junctions, exits and rest area

Distance from Zero Kilometre Stone (Adam Clark Square) in Budapest in kilometres.

 The route is full length motorway.

 Planned section

Maintenance
The operation and maintenance of the road by Hungarian Public Road Nonprofit Pte Ltd Co. This activity is provided by these highway engineers.
 near Martonvásár, kilometre trench 30
 near Balatonvilágos, kilometre trench 90
 near Fonyód, kilometre trench 150
 near Eszteregnye, kilometre trench 219

Payment
From 1 February 2015, the motorway can be used instead of the national sticker with the following county stickers:

Toll-free section
From Border of Budapest to Egér Street section (5 km – 7 km) can be used free of charge.

Significant artifacts
From Budapest to the Croatian border, the M7 motorway features the following bridges, tunnels or covered cuts:

 Bridge
 Zrinski Bridge over Mur river
 Viaduct
 Köröshegy Viaduct – Longest bridge in Hungary

European Routes

See also 

 Roads in Hungary
 Transport in Hungary
 International E-road network

External links 

National Toll Payment Services Plc. (in Hungarian, some information also in English)
 Hungarian Public Road Non-Profit Ltd. (Magyar Közút Nonprofit Zrt.)
 National Infrastructure Developer Ltd.

7